Dimitrije Bogdanović (October 11, 1930 in Belgrade – June 14, 1986 in Belgrade) was a Serbian historian and member of the Serbian Academy of Sciences and Arts. He is considered one of leading scholars on Serbian medieval literature.

Bogdanović concentrated on the history of medieval Serbian principalities and history of the Serbian Orthodox Church during the Middle Ages.

In 1978 Bogdanović became corresponding member of the Serbian Academy, in 1985 regular member.

Criticism
According to the Serbian historian Olivera Milosavljević, Bogdanović has spread negative image of Albanians with a claim that Albanian political movement is "aggressive, conquering, revanchist, conservative and nationalistic", whose goals are to destroy the Serbian nation "by expelling, killing or erasing the historical
consciousness", and all with the aim to appropriate Serbian territories. According to him, thesis about Illyrian origin of Albanians is "racist" because it determines priority right to the territories.

Works
(Incomplete list)
 Историја српског народа I-X: Од досељавања на Балкан до 1918. године / Istorija srpskog naroda I-X: Od doseljavanja na Balkan do 1918. godine (History of Serbian Nation I-X: Since arrival to the Balkans to the year 1918), group of authors, first volume published in 1981
 Књига о Косову / Knjiga o Kosovu (The Book on Kosovo), 1986 (online).

References

Sources

External links
 Biography at the Serbian Academy of Sciences and Arts website (in Serbian)
 Biography of Dimitrije Bogdanović (in Serbian)
 Bogdanovic's text on Kosovo (in English)

1930 births
1986 deaths
20th-century Serbian historians
Serbian nationalists
Scholars in Eastern Orthodoxy
Members of the Serbian Academy of Sciences and Arts
Serbian theologians
Members of the Serbian Orthodox Church